Alisertib (MLN8237) is an orally available selective aurora A kinase inhibitor developed by Takeda.  It was investigated as a treatment for relapsed or refractory peripheral T-cell lymphoma. Development was abandoned in 2015 due to poor clinical trial results.

References

Protein kinase inhibitors
Benzoic acids
Fluoroarenes
Abandoned drugs
Takeda Pharmaceutical Company brands
Chloroarenes
Benzazepines
Heterocyclic compounds with 3 rings